Gitty Djamal (born 11 May 1936) is an Iranian-German film and television actress. She has also worked as a photographer.

Selected filmography
 Stage Fright (1960)
 Carnival Confession (1960)
 Salto Mortale (1969–1972, TV series)
 The Three Musketeers (1973)
 The Four Musketeers (1974)

References

Bibliography 
 Thomas Elsaesser. Rainer Werner Fassbinder. Bertz, 2001.

External links 
 

1936 births
Living people
German film actresses
Iranian film actresses
German television actresses
Iranian television actresses
Iranian emigrants to Germany
Actresses from Tehran